Rovolon is a comune (municipality) in the Province of Padua in the Italian region Veneto, located about  west of Venice and about  southwest of Padua.

The municipality of Rovolon contains the frazioni (administrative division of a municipality) Bastia, Carbonara, and Lovolo.

Bastia has a Sunday market and is by far the most populous town of the Rovolon municipality.

Rovolon borders the following municipalities: Albettone, Barbarano Vicentino, Cervarese Santa Croce, Montegaldella, Mossano, Nanto, Teolo, Vo.

Demographic evolution

Twin towns
Rovolon is twinned with:

  Cotiporã, Brazil, since 2010

References

Cities and towns in Veneto